William Adrián Castro Rosso (born 22 May 1962 in Mercedes) is a former Uruguayan footballer.

Club career
Castro had spells with Club de Gimnasia y Esgrima La Plata in the Primera División de Argentina and Cruz Azul in the Primera División de Mexico.

International career
Castro made nine appearances for the senior Uruguay national football team from 1989 to 1991, and he was a member of the squad at the 1990 FIFA World Cup.

References

 

1962 births
Living people
Uruguayan footballers
Uruguay international footballers
1990 FIFA World Cup players
Uruguayan Primera División players
Argentine Primera División players
Liga MX players
C.A. Bella Vista players
Club Nacional de Football players
Peñarol players
C.A. Progreso players
Liverpool F.C. (Montevideo) players
Miramar Misiones players
Club de Gimnasia y Esgrima La Plata footballers
Cruz Azul footballers
Uruguayan expatriate footballers
Expatriate footballers in Argentina
Expatriate footballers in Mexico

Association football midfielders